Vervain is the fifth album by female vocalist and lyricist Liv Kristine.  It was released in 2014 on Napalm Records.

Track listing

Limited edition has three bonus tracks, two of which are vocal re-recordings of Stronghold of Angels and Love Decay with only Liv on vocals.

Production
Produced, recorded, engineered, mixed and mastered by Alexander Krull
Assistant recording engineers: Thorsten Bauer & Matthias Röderer
Additional Programming & Samples by Alexander Krull
Recorded at Mastersound Studio, Steinheim, Germany

Personnel
Liv Kristine - Vocals
Thorsten Bauer - Guitars, Guitars (acoustic), Saz, Flamenco Guitars, Mandolin, Sitar, Oud, Piano
Alexander Krull - Keyboards, Programming, Samples
Felix Born - Drums
Alessandro Pantò - Piano

Additional personnel
Michelle Darkness - additional vocals, Love Decay
Doro Pesch - additional vocals, Stronghold Of Angels

References

www.livkristine.net

2014 albums
Liv Kristine albums
Napalm Records albums
Albums produced by Alexander Krull